Austrodaphnella alcestis is a species of sea snail, a marine gastropod mollusk in the family Raphitomidae.

Description
The length of the shell attains 6.5 mm, its diameter 1.5 mm.

Distribution
This marine species occurs in the Gulf of Oman

References

External links
  Proceedings of the Malacological Society of London. Volume: 7 (1906-1907)
 

alcestis
Gastropods described in 1906